This is the list of animated television series produced in South Africa.

References

South African animated television series
South African animation
South African television-related lists